An equestrian statue of Tadeusz Kościuszko by the Italian and American artist Gaetano Trentanove is located on the south side of Milwaukee, Wisconsin, in the United States.  The bronze equestrian sculpture portrays Kościuszko in his military uniform and hat. It is located at South 9th Place and West Lincoln Avenue in Kosciuszko Park. The statue was placed in October 1904 but was not officially unveiled until June 18, 1905 with a speech by Archbishop F. Symon from Rome. The statue was moved to its present location in 1951 and a celebratory unveiling was held on September 15 of that year.

Condition
A condition assessment of the monument was conducted by McKay Lodge Conservation Laboratory. They found several condition issues some originating from the poor quality of the original cast and others due to climate. The condition problems included casting porosity, patches and plugs, chill cracks, weaknesses in armature, and a general need for cleaning. In 2013 the Restore Kosciuszko Monument Project successfully raised funds to fully restore the monument. The statue was rededicated on November 11, 2013.

See also 
 Brigadier General Thaddeus Kosciuszko statue in Washington, D.C.

References 

1900s establishments in Wisconsin
1905 sculptures
Articles containing video clips
Equestrian statues in Wisconsin
Bronze sculptures in Wisconsin
Monuments and memorials in Wisconsin
Milwaukee
Outdoor sculptures in Milwaukee
Polish-American culture in Milwaukee
Sculptures of men in Wisconsin
Relocated buildings and structures in Wisconsin